Ross Porter may refer to:

 Ross Porter (sportscaster) (born 1938), American sportscaster
 Ross Porter (Canadian broadcaster), Canadian broadcasting executive and jazz writer
 Ross Porter (cyclist), British racing cyclist